Mayfield Garden is a cool climate garden situated in Oberon in the Central Tablelands region of New South Wales, Australia. The garden is known as one of Australia's most significant horticultural destinations and has become a key element of the tourism industry in the Central West area of the state. Mayfield Garden is open daily with an entry fee, whilst the full private estate is also opened to the public for a short period during each season.

Developed by former investment banker Garrick Hawkins, Mayfield has been inspired by the gardens of Europe, which features vast greenery vistas, an avenue of trees, dazzling seasonal colours and ornamental flowering. It is made up of two main garden areas, Mayfield Garden (15 hectares) and the Hawkins' Family Private Estate (a further 50-hectares).

History
The site was originally a sheep farm, with work commencing on the garden in 1984. Garrick Hawkins started readying a small personal garden at this time in an association with local nurseryman and landscaper Peter D'Arcy. Three-decades later it has evolved into one of the largest and most significant private gardens in Australia, enhanced by the addition of hospitality and other tourism infrastructure.  Agricultural activities still occur on the 2,025 hectares (5,000 acres) of land that encircles the garden.

Collections

Mayfield
There is a prominent stone cascade that was designed after the sandstone cliffs of proximate Kanangra Walls. There is a large collection maples, possibly the largest in Australia, which go with a collection of Hydrangeas and the flashy water lilies, which bloom in the summer.

Shaped like a valley, the Valley of the Five Ponds contains woodland collection of deciduous oaks, maples, birch and beech, with a shrub groundcover of viburnum, Rhododendron molle and cornus, and winter-flowering Hellebore and summer-flowering heuchera. Other spring blossoms include; tulip, daffodil, fritillaria, crocus, grape hyacinth and allium. The region also contains a summer-blooming meadow wildflowers and hostas.   A stone water trough weaves through the valley and links the five ponds. There is also an alley of London plane trees, a 12.5-metre Obelisk Pond, a Grotto, Bluestone Bridge, Copper Tree Fountain and Sandstone gallery.

Family garden
The Hawkins' Family Garden is the private garden portion of the estate, which is an additional 50 hectares (120 acres) beyond Mayfield Garden. It features the second largest maze of its kind in Australia and plant species such as dahlias, zinnias, poppies, delphiniums, lilies, hollyhocks and lupins. The area also includes an introduced pine forest with an understory of rhododendrons and ferns, a chicken coop, a rose garden with David C.H. Austin roses and hybrid tea, wisteria, climbing hydrangea, columnar juniper. The heath gardens include Erica and Calluna species. The lake and boardwalk garden beds are aggregated with many types of Rhododendron and Mollis Azaleas.  Other elements of the private family estate which can be seen only during seasonal festivals include the Family Chapel, 70-metre Water Cascade, Kitchen Garden, Stumpery and all lakes and water features.

Facilities
The garden contains a café and produce store, where most food and items are either sourced onsite or from local suppliers. The private family garden is open seasonally, with a festival atmosphere highlighted by music, an expanded food offering and various recreational activities, such as rowing on Mayfield Lake and trekking in the garden's maze. Wedding photography and other forms of professional photography are allowed in the garden with fees applying. Dogs are also welcome in the garden, provided they remain on a leash.

Gallery

See also

Cowra Japanese Garden and Cultural Centre
Burrendong Botanic Garden and Arboretum
Mount Annan Botanical Gardens
Hunter Valley Gardens

References

External links
Official Instagram
Map Guide

Botanical gardens in New South Wales
2008 establishments in Australia
Parks in New South Wales
Urban forests
Forests of New South Wales
Central Tablelands
Oberon Council